Luck of Our Own is the only album by American country music singer Dale Daniel. It was released in 1993 via BNA Records, then known as BNA Entertainment. The album produced the singles "You Gave Her Your Name" and "Coming Back to Haunt Me", neither of which charted.

Critical reception
The album received positive reviews. Entertainment Weekly critic Alanna Nash gave it a B, saying that Daniel did not act as a "clone of country's leading divas." Jim Ridley of New Country magazine gave the album three stars out of five, comparing Daniel's voice to Kathie Baillie of Baillie & the Boys, also saying "the songs[…] tread familiar ground with enough honest feeling and detail to signify promise down the line." Billboard also gave a favorable review, saying that her "songwriting will separate Daniel from the pack."

Track listing
"Middle of a Miracle" (Don Pfrimmer, George Teren) – 3:00
"Luck of Our Own" (Gary Burr, Dale Daniel) – 3:30
"Border Line" (Daniel, Naomi Martin) – 3:19
"Where Do You Go When You Dream" (Teren, Pfrimmer) – 3:10
"Coming Back to Haunt Me" (Rick Bowles, Daniel) – 2:57
"You Gave Her Your Name" (Daniel, Martin, Pfrimmer) – 3:31
"Don't Let the Same Dog Bite You Twice" (Jimmy Stewart, Teren) – 2:57
"The Dust Ain't Settled Yet" (Craig Bickhardt, Brent Maher, Don Schlitz) – 2:48
"One More Bend" (Daniel, Martin) – 3:47
"Daddy's Little Girl" (Angela Kaset, Kenya Walker, Stan Webb) – 3:14

Personnel
Compiled from liner notes.
Gary Burr — background vocals
Dale Daniel — lead vocals, background vocals
Carol Ann Etheridge — background vocals
Sonny Garrish — steel guitar
Steve Gibson — acoustic guitar
Mike Henderson — electric guitar
Mitch Humphries — piano
Dave Innis — piano
Paul Leim — drums, percussion
Terry McMillan — harmonica
Michael Rhodes — bass guitar
Brent Rowan — electric guitar
Hank Singer — fiddle
Biff Watson — acoustic guitar
Bob Wray — bass guitar
Curtis "Mr. Harmony" Young — background vocals

References

1993 debut albums
Dale Daniel albums
BNA Records albums
Albums produced by Jerry Crutchfield